Sanseverino (family): The Sanseverino are one of the historical families most famous in the Kingdom of Naples and all of Italy, having 300 strongholds, 40 counties, nine marquisates, twelve duchies and ten principalities primarily distributed in Calabria, Campania, Basilicata, and Apulia. Among its members, one finds a cardinal, a viceroy, marshals and condottiere.

Sanseverino is also a surname, and may refer to:
 Roscemanno Sanseverino, 12th century cardinal
 Antonio Sanseverino, (ca. 1477-1543), Neapolitan branch; Cardinal Priest (1527-1537), Cardinal Bishop (1537–1543); Archbishop of Taranto (1528–1543).
 Ferdinando Sanseverino (1507–1572), prince of Salerno and Italian condottiero
 Aurora Sanseverino (1669–1726), Italian noblewoman and salonniere
 Gaetano Sanseverino (1811–1865), Italian theologian
 Stéphane Sanseverino (born 1961), contemporary French singer, best known as Sanseverino

Fictional characters
 Robyn Sanseverino, an FBI agent with a recurring role on HBO's popular crime-drama series, The Sopranos

See also
 San Severino (disambiguation)

References